Yukarınasırlı is a village in the Gölbaşı District, Adıyaman Province, Turkey. The village is populated by Turks and had a population of 843 in 2021. Both Alevis and Sunni Muslims are present in the village.

References

Villages in Gölbaşı District, Adıyaman Province